Athabasca System Hydroelectric Stations are a series of small run-of-the-river hydroelectricity stations on the Charlot River in the Athabasca region owned by SaskPower, located near Uranium City, Saskatchewan, Canada.

Description 
The system  consists of the:
Wellington Power Station  - a two unit station generating 4.8 MW (the first 2.4 MW unit was commissioned in 1939 and the second in 1959).
Waterloo Power Station  -a single 8 MW unit commissioned in 1961 and located downstream of the Wellington Power Station.
Charlot River Power Station  - a two unit station commissioned in 1980 and located downstream of the Waterloo Power Station. It is served by the Charlot River Airport.

References

External links 

  SaskPower Station Description

Hydroelectric power stations in Saskatchewan
SaskPower